Deh-e Qazi (also Romanized as Deh-e Qāẕī and Deh Qāzī; also known as Khāneh Qāzī and Maskūkān) is a village in Hotkan Rural District, in the Central District of Zarand County, Kerman Province, Iran. At the 2006 census, its population was 81, in 26 families.

References 

Populated places in Zarand County